Marinko Madžgalj (21 August 1978 – 26 March 2016) was a Serbian actor, singer and television presenter.

Biography 
Madžgalj was born in Belgrade, Yugoslavia and was raised in Kotor, present-day Montenegro. He was one half of the Flamingosi duo with TV presenter Ognjen Amidžić. His stage name in the duo is Valentino. He died of pancreatic cancer in Belgrade on 26 March 2016. He was married to actress Dubravka Mijatović from 2007 until 2014.

Selected filmography

Television

References

External links
 
 Flamingosi official site

1978 births
2016 deaths
People from Kotor
Male actors from Belgrade
Serbs of Montenegro
Serbian male actors
21st-century Serbian male singers
Serbian pop singers